Pungo-Andongo is a town and commune of Angola, located in the province of Malanje.

See also 
 Black Rocks at Pungo Andongo

References

External link 

Populated places in Malanje Province